Noemiamea is a genus of sea snails, marine gastropod mollusks in the family Pyramidellidae, the pyrams and their allies.

Species
Species within the genus Noemiamea include:
 Noemiamea batllori Moreno, Peñas & Rolán, 2003
 Noemiamea dolioliformis (Jeffreys, 1848)

References

External links
 To GenBank
 To World Register of Marine Species

Pyramidellidae
Gastropod genera